Okhlopkovo is a rural locality (a village) in Saryevskoye Rural Settlement, Vyaznikovsky District, Vladimir Oblast, Russia. The population was 21 as of 2010.

Geography 
Okhlopkovo is located on the Tara River, 39 km northwest of Vyazniki (the district's administrative centre) by road. Shustovo is the nearest rural locality.

References 

Rural localities in Vyaznikovsky District